Glodeanu-Siliștea is a commune located in the southern part of Buzău County, Muntenia, Romania, in the Bărăgan Plain. It is composed of eight villages: Casota, Cârligu Mare, Cârligu Mic, Corbu, Cotorca, Glodeanu-Siliștea, Satu Nou and Văcăreasca.

Location

Glodeanu-Siliștea is situated approximately 90 km northeast of the national capital Bucharest. The city of Buzău (the county capital) can be reached via Smârdana, Brădeanul, Smeeni (48 km), or through Glodeanul Cârlig, Văcăreasca and Casota and the DN2 road (36 km). Glodeanu-Siliștea is also 20 km away from towns of Mizil and Pogoanele, 25 km Urziceni and 45 km from Buzău.

References

Communes in Buzău County
Localities in Muntenia